William Kati (Smiley) Heather (born 7 July 1958) is a Cook Islands politician and former Cabinet Minister. He represented the seat of Ruaau in the Cook Islands Parliament from 2006 to 2022 and is Deputy Leader of the Cook Islands Democratic Party. He is the older brother of Cook Islands Party MP Teariki Heather.

Heather was born in Rarotonga and educated at Arorangi Primary School and Tereora College in the Cook Islands and Onslow College in Wellington, New Zealand.  From 1980 to 1997 Heather played for the Cook Islands national rugby union team.  He worked as a public servant in the Cook Islands Ministry of Works, Energy and Physical Planning (MOWEPP) from 1992, and in 1997 became Director of Road Works. He was elected to Parliament as a member of the Democratic Party in the 2006 snap election.  Following the election, he was appointed Democratic Party whip.

In December 2009 he was appointed to Cabinet as Minister for Transport, Infrastructure & Planning, and Energy following the sacking of Terepai Maoate and resignation of Democratic party cabinet ministers. As a result, he was expelled from the Democratic Party on 8 April 2010.

He was re-elected at the 2010 election as a Democratic candidate. In August 2012 he was elected Deputy Leader of the Democratic party. He was re-elected in the 2014 election, and in April 2015 was elected leader of the Democratic Party.  In June 2017 he became leader of the opposition again.

Heather was re-elected at the 2018 election. In February 2020 he was appointed Democratic Party spokesperson for Corrective Services, Infrastructure and the Public Service Commission. In march 2021 he was appointed deputy leader, replacing Terepai Maoate Jnr.

He lost his seat in the 2022 Cook Islands general election.

References

Cook Island rugby union players
Living people
Members of the Parliament of the Cook Islands
1958 births
People educated at Onslow College
People from Rarotonga
Democratic Party (Cook Islands) politicians
Energy ministers of the Cook Islands
Infrastructure ministers of the Cook Islands
Planning ministers of the Cook Islands
Transport ministers of the Cook Islands
Cook Islands international rugby union players